Asilabad (also Romanized as Aşīlābād and Aslābād) is a village in Juqin Rural District, in the Central District of Shahriar County, Tehran Province, Iran. At the 2006 census, its population was 4,579, in 1,167 families.

References 

Populated places in Shahriar County